Oliver Jalen Harvey (born 28 August 1993) is a Bermudian football player.

International
He made his Bermuda national football team debut on 14 July 2013 in an Island Games match against Greenland.

He was selected for the 2019 CONCACAF Gold Cup squad.

References

External links
 
 

1993 births
People from Hamilton, Bermuda
Living people
Bermudian footballers
Bermuda international footballers
Association football defenders
DePaul Blue Demons men's soccer players
Bermudian expatriate footballers
Expatriate soccer players in the United States
2019 CONCACAF Gold Cup players
BAA Wanderers F.C. players